N-Methyl-1,3-benzodioxolylpentanamine (MBDP; Methyl-K, UWA-091), also known as 3,4-methylenedioxy-α-propyl-N-methylphenethylamine, is a psychoactive drug of the phenethylamine chemical class. It is the N-methyl analogue of 1,3-benzodioxolylpentanamine (BDP; K). Methyl-K was first synthesized by Alexander Shulgin ("Sasha" Shulgin). In his book PiHKAL ("Phenethylamines i Have Known And Loved"), the minimum dosage is listed as 100 mg, and the duration is unknown. Very little is known about the pharmacology, pharmacokinetics, effects, and toxicity of Methyl-K.

Legality

United Kingdom
This substance is a Class A drug in the Drugs controlled by the UK Misuse of Drugs Act.

See also
 Pentylone (bk-MBDP)
 Ethylbenzodioxolylpentanamine (EBDP; Ethyl-K)
 Methylbenzodioxolylbutanamine (MBDB; Methyl-J)
 UWA-101

References

Phenethylamines
Designer drugs
Benzodioxoles